Jassidophaga fasciata is a species of fly in the family Pipunculidae.

Distribution
Europe.

References

Pipunculidae
Insects described in 1840
Diptera of Europe
Taxa named by Karl Ludwig Friedrich von Roser